Girau may refer to:
Girau do Ponciano, Brazil
Girau, Iran